Domar was a mythological king of Sweden.

Domar may also refer to:

People
 Evsey Domar (1914–1997), Russian-American economist
 Domar (caste), Hindu caste found in the state of Uttar Pradesh in India

Places
 Domar Upazila, Bangladesh
 In Tibet:
Domar (Shuanghu), a village and township-level division
:zh:多玛乡 (安多县), see Amdo County
:zh:多玛乡 (日土县), see Rutog County

Other terms
 Harrod-Domar model, a model of economic growth resulting from savings and capital investment
 Domar aggregation a method in economics for combining industry data together to get an aggregate total